Gordon Gray (May 30, 1909 – November 26, 1982) was an American attorney and government official during the administrations of Harry Truman (1945–53) and Dwight Eisenhower (1953–61) associated with defense and national security.

Biography

Family
Gordon Gray was born in Baltimore, Maryland, the son of Bowman Gray Sr. and Nathalie Lyons Gray.  He was married in 1938 to the former Jane Boyden Craige, and they had four sons: Gordon Gray Jr., Burton C. Gray, C. Boyden Gray and Bernard Gray. After Jane's death, Gray married the former Nancy Maguire Beebe. His father Bowman, his uncle James A. Gray Jr. and later his brother, Bowman Gray Jr., were all heads of R.J. Reynolds Tobacco Company.

His son, C. Boyden Gray, a graduate of Harvard and the University of North Carolina Law School, served as White House counsel for President George Herbert Walker Bush. His nephew, Lyons Gray, also a graduate of both North Carolina and Yale, is a former member of the North Carolina House of Representatives, chief financial officer of the Environmental Protection Agency, and state Secretary of Revenue.

Education
Gordon Gray attended Woodberry Forest School for high school. He graduated from the University of North Carolina in 1930, where he was a member of Delta Kappa Epsilon fraternity (Beta chapter) & the secretive, Order of Gimghoul.  He earned his law degree from Yale Law School in 1933 and practiced law for two years in New York City before returning to Winston-Salem. UNC presented Gray with an honorary law degree in 1949.

Public career
Gray began his public life as a lawyer. In 1937, he bought the Piedmont Publishing Company, owner of the Winston-Salem Journal, The Twin City Sentinel, and WSJS radio. He added WSJS-FM in 1947 and WSJS-TV in 1953.
He sold the newspapers in 1968, but formed Triangle Broadcasting to hold onto WSJS-AM-FM-TV. He also bought the local cable franchise for Winston-Salem, a move that forced him to sell off the broadcasting outlets in 1972.

He served in the North Carolina General Assembly from 1939 to 1943 and from 1947 to 1949, representing Forsyth County. He entered the U.S. Army in 1942 as a private and rose to captain, serving in Europe with General Omar Bradley's forces. Gray's service to the federal government began with his appointment as President Harry S. Truman's assistant secretary of the army in 1947; two years later, he was appointed Secretary of the Army.  He served in this post from 1949 until 1950.  The following year he became director of the newly formed Psychological Strategy Board which planned for and coordinated government psychological operations; he remained in the post until his resignation in January 1952, all the while continuing to lead the University of North Carolina. He was the second president of the Consolidated University of North Carolina, succeeding Frank Porter Graham in 1950.

In 1954 Gray chaired a committee appointed by AEC chairman Lewis Strauss which recommended revoking Robert Oppenheimer's security clearance. The Gray Board, as it was known, issued its split decision on May 27, 1954, with Gray and Thomas A. Morgan recommending the revocation, despite their finding that Oppenheimer was a "loyal citizen." Dr. Ward V. Evans, a conservative Republican and the third member of the board, dissented, saying that most of the allegations against Oppenheimer had been heard before, in 1947, when he had originally received his clearance. In the book American Prometheus: The Triumph and Tragedy of J. Robert Oppenheimer the chairmanship of Gray during the hearings was described as severely lacking. Gray had allowed that the prosecutors briefed the committee for a full week without representatives from the defendants being present. Moreover, Gray let the prosecutors use documents and testimonies that the defendants attorneys were denied access to, as well as material that was obtained by illegal means such as unwarranted wiretaps. The authors called the Gray Board a "veritable kangaroo court in which the head judge accepted the prosecutors lead".

Gray shocked proponents of public education in North Carolina when he said, in a November 1954 Founder's Day speech at Guilford College, that "if I had to make a choice between a complete system of publicly supported higher education or a complete system of private higher education, I would choose the latter as a greater safeguard of the things for which we live." Less than a year later, Secretary of Defense Charles Erwin Wilson named Gray assistant secretary for international security affairs and Gray's brief career in academia was ended.

President Dwight D. Eisenhower appointed him to head the Office of Defense Mobilization in 1957, where he served until the office's consolidation in 1958. Eisenhower then appointed Gray his National Security Advisor from 1958 until 1961. On January 18, 1961, President Eisenhower awarded Gray the Medal of Freedom. He served on the President's Foreign Intelligence Advisory Board under Presidents John F. Kennedy, Lyndon B. Johnson, Richard M. Nixon and Gerald R. Ford. In 1976, he was awarded the United States Military Academy's Sylvanus Thayer Award.

From 1962 to 1963, Gray was head of the Federal City Council, a group of business, civic, education, and other leaders interested in economic development in Washington, D.C.

Gray was also publisher of the Winston-Salem Journal, chairman of the board of Piedmont Publishing Company and chairman of the National Trust for Historic Preservation.

References

External links
 Inventory of the Office of President of the University of North Carolina (System): Gordon Gray Records, 1950-1955, in the University Archives, UNC-Chapel Hill.
Papers of Gordon Gray, Dwight D. Eisenhower Presidential Library 
Records of the White House Office of the Special Assistant for National Security Affairs, Dwight D. Eisenhower Presidential Library
Undersecretary of the Army biography
Gordan Gray biography in Secretaries of War and Secretaries of the Army, United States Army Center of Military History.
The American Presidency Project
Gordon Gray Photograph Collection United States Army Heritage and Education Center, Carlisle, Pennsylvania

|-

|-

|-

|-

|-

|-

1909 births
1982 deaths
Lawyers from Baltimore
Military personnel from Baltimore
20th-century American politicians
Bowman Gray family
Eisenhower administration cabinet members
Leaders of the University of North Carolina at Chapel Hill
North Carolina state senators
Presidents of the University of North Carolina System
United States Assistant Secretaries of Defense
United States National Security Advisors
United States Secretaries of the Army
United States Under Secretaries of the Army
University of North Carolina at Chapel Hill alumni
Woodberry Forest School alumni